Malambo is a folk dance in Argentina, a dance of gauchos. It is a solo dance of men (although it may be performed in groups). Its notable elements are elaborate leg movements with energetic zapateados (stomping) and cepillados ("brushing"/"scrubbing").

Dance scholar and folklorist Ventura Lynch described it as "a battle between men who stomp in turn to music".

There was no particular choreography for the dance. C.J. Videla-Rivero described it as follows: "One gaucho taps, kicks, crosses his legs, pounds the earth with the side of his feet, make his spurs tinkle, and fills the air with a thousand and one different figures while his opponent, crouched, watches him."

It may be performed in various ways: solo, in groups (synchronized or individual choreographies), counterpoint vis a vis, counterpoint quartets. The last two are of competitive form (in fact, in this form malambo was born): the opponents take turns, and the one who stomps the best, wins.

This so particular and spirited way of dancing was popularized at the beginning of the 19th century in Argentina. The first musical version of malambo was published by Ventura Lynch in 1883.

A major Malambo performance and competition event, is held annually in Laborde, Córdoba since 1966. Malambo also features prominently at the annual Cosquín Folk Festival.

Malevo, an Argentine dance troupe, made it to the semifinals of America's Got Talent in 2016.

References

External links

Argentine dances
Argentine folklore